Perruel is a commune in the Eure department in Normandy in northern France.

The village shelters the ancient abbey of Isle-Dieu, today a farm on the road between Perruel and Vascoeuil.

Population

See also
Communes of the Eure department

References

Communes of Eure